Felton is a masculine given name. Notable people with the name include:

Felton Grandison Clark (1903-1970), African-American university president
 Felton Gale, Football coach
 Felton Hervey, English politician, and member of the British royal household
 Felton Hervey-Bathurst, English soldier
 Felton Holt, English general
 Felton Jarvis, Record producer
 Felton Legere, Canadian politician
 Felton Messina, Martial arts instructor
 Felton Perry, Actor
 Felton Pilate, Singer, songwriter, record producer
 Felton Spencer, Basketball player
 Felton Stratton, Baseball player
 Felton Turner, Crime victim
 Felton T. Wright, Football coach

Masculine given names